The Silver Lining is a 1932 American pre-Code comedy film directed by Alan Crosland and written by Claire Corvalho and Gertrude Orr. Starring Maureen O'Sullivan, Betty Compson, John Warburton, and Montagu Love. it was released on April 16, 1932, by United Artists.

Cast 
Maureen O'Sullivan as Joyce Moore
Betty Compson as Kate Flynn
John Warburton as Larry Clark
Montagu Love as Michael Moore
Mary Doran as Doris Lee
Cornelius Keefe as Jerry
Martha Mattox as Matron
Wally Albright as Bobby O'Brien
Grace Valentine as Mrs. O'Brien
J. Frank Glendon as Judge
Jane Kerr as Matron
Mildred Golden as Ella Preston
Marion Stokes as Edna Joyce
Helen Gibson as Dorothy Dent

References

External links
 

1932 films
American black-and-white films
Films directed by Alan Crosland
United Artists films
American comedy films
1932 comedy films
1930s English-language films
1930s American films